John Robert Anderson (October 20, 1922 – August 7, 1992) was an American character actor who performed in hundreds of stage, film, and television productions during a career that spanned over four decades.

Life and career
Anderson was born in 1922 and raised in Clayton, Illinois. He served in the United States Coast Guard during World War II.  He also held a master's degree in drama from the University of Iowa.

Anderson started out on Broadway, including an appearance in the musical Paint Your Wagon in 1951. He later worked primarily in film and television.

Standing , he bore a strong resemblance to U.S. President Abraham Lincoln, whom he portrayed three times. He appeared in Alfred Hitchcock's Psycho (1960) as "California Charlie", the used car salesman who helps Marion Crane (Janet Leigh). On television, he appeared in such series as The Rockford Files, Dick Powell's Zane Grey Theatre, Gunsmoke, The Rifleman, Laramie, Have Gun – Will Travel , The Alfred Hitchcock Hour, The Virginian, The Life and Legend of Wyatt Earp, The Californians, Johnny Ringo, Bonanza, Little House on the Prairie, Trackdown, The Big Valley, Tales of Wells Fargo, Emergency!, The Incredible Hulk, MacGyver and Voyage to the Bottom of the Sea (episode "Cradle of the Deep").

Anderson was cast on The Rat Patrol four times (three of those occasions as the same character). He also made three guest appearances on Perry Mason, which include the episodes "The Case of the Calendar Girl" (1959), "The Case of the Bartered Bikini" (1959), and "The Case of the Greek Goddess". In 1961 Anderson appeared as Hassayampa Edwards in the TV western Lawman in the episode titled "Hassayampa". He can also be seen in other series produced in this period, such as Overland Trail, The Tall Man, and The Legend of Jesse James. He portrays an eccentric farmer who jealously guards his prize watermelon with a shotgun in "For the Love of Willadean: A Taste of Melon", a story originally broadcast on Walt Disney's Wonderful World of Color in 1964.

Anderson had a recurring role in MacGyver as Harry Jackson, MacGyver's grandfather. Other credits include: Man Without a Gun; Hawaii Five-O; M*A*S*H as Major General Collins; Once an Eagle; Rich Man, Poor Man Book II; Backstairs at the White House; Star Trek: The Next Generation and Dallas. A recurring Twilight Zone actor, he appeared in four different episodes:  "The Old Man in the Cave", "Of Late I Think of Cliffordville", "The Odyssey of Flight 33", and  "A Passage for Trumpet". He was also The Interrogator on an episode of The Outer Limits titled "Nightmare".

The first release of the 1993 soundtrack album Music from the Television Series Quantum Leap was dedicated to him. He had been featured in the fourth season episode "The Last Gunfighter" of that sci-fi series as Pat Knight; the episode had first aired about six months before his death.

Personal life and death
On June 8, 1946, Anderson married Patricia A. Cason in the rectory of St. Boniface Catholic Church in Quincy and the couple moved to Iowa City, where Anderson studied in the liberal arts college at the University of Iowa and earned his master's degree in drama. Anderson was married to Patricia Ann Cason until her death on February 18, 1989. Three years later, Anderson suffered a fatal heart attack at his home in Sherman Oaks, California, at the age of 69.

Body of work

Partial filmography

 1953 The Eddie Cantor Story as Bobby (uncredited)
 1955 Target Zero as Undetermined Role (uncredited)
 1957 Perry Mason as George Andrews
 1957 Gunsmoke 15 appearances
 1957 Dick Powell's Zane Grey Theatre Episode: "Episode in Darkness"
 1958 The True Story of Lynn Stuart as Doc (uncredited)
 1958 The Californian (three episodes) as Reed Bullard / Slater / The Deacon
 1959 Last Train from Gun Hill as Salesman In Horseshoe (uncredited)
 1960 Psycho as Charlie "California Charlie"
 1960 The Twilight Zone
 1960 Le olimpiadi dei mariti
 1960 The Wackiest Ship in the Army as Sailor (uncredited)
 1960-1969 Bonanza (three episodes)
 1961 The Rifleman (Eleven episodes) as Will Temple 
 1961 Alfred Hitchcock Presents (Season 7,  Episode 8) "The Old Pro" as Nicholson 
 1961 Bat Masterson (Season 3, Episode 15) "The Court-marshal of Major Mars" as Major Mars
 1962 Walk on the Wild Side as Preacher
 1962 Geronimo as Jeremiah Burns
 1962 Ride the High Country as Elder Hammond
 1963 Perry Mason as Dan O'Malley
 1963 The Outer Limits as Ebonite Interrogator
 1963 My Favorite Martian (episode "Raffles No. 2")  as Captain Farrow
 1963 Laramie (episode "The Violent Ones")  as Bob Blayne
 1965 The Satan Bug as Agent Reagan
 1965 The Hallelujah Trail as Sergeant Buell
 1966 Namu, the Killer Whale as Joe Clausen
 1966 The Fortune Cookie as Abraham Lincoln (uncredited)
 1967 A Covenant with Death as Dietrich
 1967 Welcome to Hard Times as Ezra Maple / Isaac Maple
 1968 Day of the Evil Gun as Captain Jefferson Addis
 1968 A Man Called Gannon as Capper
 1968 5 Card Stud as Marshal Dana
 1968 Massacre Harbor as Major Indrus
 1969 Heaven with a Gun as Asa Beck
 1969 The Great Bank Robbery as Mayor Kincaid
 1969 Young Billy Young as Boone
 1970 The Animals as Sheriff Allan Pierce
 1970 Cotton Comes to Harlem as Captain Bryce
 1970 Soldier Blue as Colonel Iverson
 1971 Man and Boy as Stretch
 1971 Bearcats! (episode "Man in a Cage") as Judge Juan O'Brian 
 1972 The Stepmother as Inspector Darnezi
 1972 Molly and Lawless John as Sheriff Marvin Parker
 1973 Counselor at Crime as Don Vito Albanese
 1973 Night Gallery (episode "Through the Flame Darkly") as Sheriff
 1973 Executive Action as Halliday
 1974 Heatwave! as Toler
 1974 The Dove as Mike Turk
 1974 Kung Fu (Episode "Crossties") as Jack Youngblood
 1975 Little House On The Prairie as Mr. Pike
 1975 The Specialist as Pike Smith
 1975 Emergency! "Smoke Eater" as Captain Bob Roberts
 1976 Rich Man, Poor Man Book II (mini-series) as Scotty
 1976 The Rockford Files (episode "Coulter City Wildcat") as Gerald A. O'Malley
 1976 Once an Eagle (mini-series) as George Varney
 1977 The Lincoln Conspiracy as Abraham Lincoln
 1977 The Last Hurrah as Amos Force
 1979 Backstairs at the White House (mini-series) as President Franklin Delano Roosevelt
 1979 The Incredible Hulk (episode "Wildfire") as Mike Callahan
 1980 Out of the Blue as T.V. Interviewer
 1980 Smokey and the Bandit II as Governor
 1981 Zoot Suit as Judge F.W. Charles
 1982 The American Adventure as Mark Twain / Franklin D. Roosevelt (voice)
 1982 The First Time as Paul Cooper
 1982 Voyagers! - "The Day the Rebs Took Lincoln" as Abraham Lincoln
 1983 M*A*S*H - "Say No More" as General Addison Collins
 1985 MacGyver - as "Grandpa" Harry Jackson
 1985 North and South (mini-series) as William Hazard
 1986 Amerasia
 1986 Dream West (TV mini-series) as Brigadier  General Brooke
 1986 Never Too Young to Die as Arliss
 1986 Scorpion as Joel / Noel G. Koch
 1988 Eight Men Out as Judge Kenesaw Mountain Landis
 1989 Deadly Innocents as Gus
 1989 Star Trek: The Next Generation - "The Survivors" as Kevin Uxbridge 
 1991 In Broad Daylight (television movie) as Wes Westerman
 1991 Babe Ruth as Judge Kenesaw Mountain Landis
 1992 Quantum Leap as Pat Knight

References

External links
 
 
 

1922 births
1992 deaths
20th-century American male actors
Actors from Quincy, Illinois
American male film actors
American male stage actors
American male television actors
Film directors from Illinois
Male Western (genre) film actors
United States Coast Guard enlisted
United States Coast Guard personnel of World War II
University of Iowa alumni
Western (genre) television actors